Nina Flack is a Swedish bowler who was part of a gold medal-winning trio at the World Women's Championship of 2007. In 2013 she was among the fifty top-ranked female bowlers in Europe.

References 

Swedish ten-pin bowling players
Living people
Year of birth missing (living people)